The Kappelberg Tunnel is a road tunnel on the Bundesstraße 14, located near the city of Stuttgart, Germany.

Following failings identified by the European Tunnel Assessment Programme, the tunnel underwent a €12 million refurbishment programme, which resulted in a rating of "very good" in 2006.

References

Road tunnels in Germany